Water International is a peer-reviewed scientific journal covering research on water resources. It is the official journal of the International Water Resources Association and was established in 1972. The journal is published by Routledge in 8 issues per year and focuses on international water resources including science, technology, governance, management, and policy. The editor-in-chief is James E. Nickum (International Water Resources Association, Japan).

Abstracting and indexing 
The journal is abstracted and indexed in:

According to the Journal Citation Reports, the journal has a 2021 impact factor of 3.395.

See also
Water Research
Water (journal)
Journal of Irrigation & Drainage Engineering

References

External links

Publications established in 1972
English-language journals
Routledge academic journals
Hydrology journals
8 times per year journals